Taras Anatolyevich Shelest (born 3 February 1980) is a former Russian professional footballer.

Club career
He made his Russian Football National League debut for FC Spartak-Chukotka Moscow on 1 July 2000 in a game against FC Rubin Kazan.

Personal life
He is a son of the manager Anatoli Shelest.

External links
Profile

1980 births
Expatriate footballers in Latvia
FC Oryol players
FC SKA-Khabarovsk players
FC Akhmat Grozny players
FC Tom Tomsk players
FK Liepājas Metalurgs players
Living people
Russian expatriate footballers
Russian expatriate sportspeople in Latvia
Russian footballers
Russian people of Ukrainian descent
Association football midfielders
FC Yenisey Krasnoyarsk players